The third season of American Idol premiered on Monday, January 19, 2004, and continued until May 26, 2004. The third season was won by Fantasia Barrino, who defeated Diana DeGarmo by an approximate margin of 2% (1.3 million votes); the vote total (65 million votes) was the highest recorded vote total in the show's history until the May 23, 2007, finale of the sixth season. This season also featured future EGOT winner Jennifer Hudson, who finished seventh in the competition. This was the last season to be aired in standard definition, with the only exception being the grand finale.

This was the first season where both the winner and the runner-up had been in the bottom 2 or 3 prior to the finale, and  the first season to have a finale with two female contestants. It is also the first season where a Wild Card contestant, Leah LaBelle, was eliminated in the first episode of the finals. It was the first season to have a gender imbalance among the finalists, with eight female finalists and four male finalists.

Both Fantasia and Diana DeGarmo released a single after the finale. Fantasia's first single, released in June 2004 on the RCA record label, entered the Billboard Hot 100 at number one, making Fantasia the first artist in the history of Billboard to debut at number one with their first single. In addition to Fantasia and DeGarmo, Jasmine Trias, LaToya London, George Huff, Jennifer Hudson, and Camile Velasco have all released albums since the season ended. Leah LaBelle was signed by Epic Records. This is also, to date, the only season in the show's history to produce multiple Grammy Award winners, courtesy of Fantasia (in 2011) and Hudson (in 2009 and 2017).

Changes
Unlike previous seasons, this season the semi-finalists performed in front of a small studio audience, with orchestra accompaniment on backing tape.
During Top 10 was the first time where there were five judges when the duo Ashford & Simpson joined as judges.

Regional auditions
Auditions were held in the summer of 2003 in the following cities:

In this season over 80,000 attended the auditions in 6 cities.  Paula Abdul was absent from the Los Angeles audition.  A prominent auditioner was William Hung, a University of California, Berkeley student, who became a surprise cult figure following his tuneless rendition of Ricky Martin's "She Bangs" at the San Francisco audition. He was later invited back to perform on a special edition Uncut, Uncensored and Untalented.  His appearance on the show landed him a record deal with Koch Records and he released an album soon afterwards.

During the audition round in Houston, Texas, auditioner Jonathan Rey threw a cup of water at Simon, who moments earlier commented that he was terrible and "there's not a song in the world you could sing." Security quickly escorted Jonathan out, and Houston police questioned him, but released him after Simon decided against pressing assault charges on him. Another prominent auditioners that year was Alan Ritchson who sang to Paula Abdul alone.

Hollywood week
There were 117 contestants in the first Hollywood round which was held at the Pasadena Civic Center in Pasadena, California.  The contestants first came onto the stage in groups but each performed solo and talked briefly about themselves.  Simon Cowell was not impressed with their performances.  They were also asked to write original lyrics and melody for one of ten song titles given and perform their song the next day.  After their performance, they were divided into four groups and one group was eliminated.

In the next round, the remaining 87 contestants performed in groups in three.  The girls and boys were separate and they were each given 3 different songs to choose – Girls with The Supremes' "You Can't Hurry Love", Vonda Shepard's "Tell Him",  Candi Staton's "Young Hearts Run Free", the boys with Billy Joel's "Tell Her About It", Rick Astley's "Never Gonna Give You Up", The Drifters's "Up on the Roof".  30 contestants were cut and 57 then advanced to the next stage where they performed solo. The contestants were then divided into three groups and placed in separate rooms, with one group sent home.  32 contestants remained for the semi-finals.

Semi-finals
The contestants who reached this stage were referred to in the show as the Top 32 finalists.

George Huff replaced Donnie Williams in Semifinal Round 4 after Williams was disqualified following a DUI arrest.

Unlike previous seasons, this season the contestants performed in front of a small studio audience, with orchestra accompaniment on backing tape.  As with the second season, in these rounds, two from each group were selected by public vote to proceed on to the Top 12, and those who failed at any of the previous stages were given a second chance in the wild-card show.

During the wild card show, twelve contestants were invited back to participate. However, in a controversial move, after being evaluated during the week in rehearsals, only eight were chosen by the judges to sing that night.

Four contestants in the wild card round were eliminated by the judges before they had the chance to sing. They were Lisa Leuschner, Eric Yoder, Tiara Purifoy, and Marque Lynche.

Color key:

Group 1

Group 2

Group 3

Group 4

Wild Card

Finalists

Fantasia Barrino (born June 30, 1984, in High Point, North Carolina, aged 19 on the show) auditioned in Atlanta.  Her audition songs were Lauryn Hill's "Killing Me Softly with His Song" and Tina Turner's "Proud Mary".  She has performed from a young age with her family who had released a CD.  She performed Aretha Franklin's "Think" in the Hollywood rounds. At , Barrino became the first teenage contestant to win American Idol.
Diana DeGarmo (born June 16, 1987, in Birmingham, Alabama, age 16 on the show) is from Snellville, Georgia, and auditioned in Honolulu, Hawaii with Aretha Franklin's "Chain of Fools".  She was on the show America's Most Talented Kid in 2002 as well as other TV shows.  She performed Ike & Tina Turner's "A Fool in Love" in the Hollywood rounds. At , she was the youngest contestant reach into the finals until Thia Megia and Lauren Alaina made to the finals in the tenth season. She was also the youngest runner-up in the history of American Idol.
Jasmine Trias (born November 3, 1986, in Honolulu, 17 on the show) is from Mililani, Hawaii and auditioned in Honolulu. She is the first Asian American contestant in American Idol who made it to the final three, followed by Jessica Sanchez in the eleventh season.
LaToya London (born December 29, 1978, in San Francisco, 25 on the show) is from Oakland, California and auditioned in San Francisco with Aretha Franklin's "Chain of Fools".
George Huff (born November 4, 1980, in New Orleans, aged 23 on the show) auditioned in Houston, Texas with Joe Cocker's "You Are So Beautiful".  He performed Luther Vandross' "Here and Now" in the Hollywood rounds.
John Stevens (born July 28, 1987, in Buffalo, New York, 16 on the show) is from East Amherst, New York and auditioned in New York City with Fred Astaire's "The Way You Look Tonight".  He performed Tony Bennett's "I Left My Heart in San Francisco" in Hollywood. He was the youngest male contestant to reach into the finals until Daniel Seavey in the fourteenth season.
Jennifer Hudson (born September 12, 1981, in Chicago, aged 22 on the show) auditioned in Atlanta with Aretha Franklin's "Share Your Love with Me".
Jon Peter Lewis (born November 7, 1979, in Lincoln, Nebraska, aged 24 on the show) is from Rexburg, Idaho and auditioned in Honolulu with Van Morrison's "Crazy Love".  He was dubbed the 'pen salesman' by Simon Cowell.  He performed The Jackson 5's "I Want You Back".
Camile Velasco (born September 1, 1985, in Makati, Philippines, 18 on the show) is from Haiku, Maui and auditioned in Honolulu with Fugees' "Ready or Not".
 Amy Adams (born July 25, 1979, in Kansas City, Kansas, aged 24 on the show) is from Bakersfield, California and auditioned in Atlanta, Georgia with Fontella Bass' "Rescue Me".  She performed Jennifer Rush's "The Power of Love" in Hollywood.
Matthew Rogers (born September 16, 1978, in Rancho Cucamonga, California, 25 on the show) auditioned in Los Angeles with James Ingram's "Just Once".
Leah LaBelle (September 8, 1986 - January 31, 2018, born in Toronto, Canada, aged 17 on the show) was from Seattle and auditioned in New York with Whitney Houston's "I Believe in You and Me". She auditioned with her birth name Leah Vladowski. Her family was originally from Bulgaria, and immigrated to the United States. She performed Diana Ross' "Theme from Mahogany (Do You Know Where You're Going To)" at the Hollywood rounds. In 2011, LaBelle signed to Epic Records. LaBelle was killed in a car crash alongside her boyfriend Rasual Butler on January 31, 2018, making her the third American Idol finalist to die, following Rickey Smith in 2016 and Michael Johns in 2014.

Finals
In this season, guest judges were introduced in some episodes, and sometimes the mentor joined as judges.

In the result shows, the bottom two vote-getters reprised their performances before the elimination was announced, or only the eliminated one performed after the result is revealed, or they performed before and after their elimination as in Top 5 when George Huff reprised both his songs from the performance night.

Color key:

Top 12 – Soul

Top 11 – Country

Top 10 – Motown
 Guest judges: Nick Ashford and Valerie Simpson

Top 9 – Elton John
 Guest Mentor: Elton John

Top 8 – Movie Soundtracks
Guest judge: Quentin Tarantino

Top 7 – Barry Manilow
 Guest Mentor and Judge: Barry Manilow

Top 6 – Gloria Estefan
Mentor and guest judge – Gloria Estefan
Guest band – Miami Sound Machine

Top 5 – Big Band

Top 4 – Disco
Guest judge: Donna Summer

Top 3 – Idols' Choice, Judges' Choice, Clive's Choice
Guest judge: Clive Davis

Top 2 – Finale

Paul Anka made an appearance in the season finale.

After a nationwide vote of more than 65 million votes in total—more than the first two seasons combined—Fantasia Barrino won the American Idol title beating out Diana DeGarmo.  The third season was also shown in Australia on Network Ten about half a week after episodes were shown in the US.  Leah LaBelle is the first contestant to advance to the finals via Wild Card then get eliminated in the first week of the finals.

As a nod to the "Did Clay see the card?" controversy in the second season, Ryan Seacrest was instructed to memorize the winner's name and the vote margin and was given a blank card to hold while reporting the results.  However, in a post-show interview with USA Today, Diana DeGarmo admitted that she had figured out that she had not won when the contestants were going over the schedule for the finale and she saw she would be singing "I Believe" (the winner's single) before the results were announced.  Realizing that she would not be scheduled to sing a song she would have to sing again minutes later if she were announced as the winner, she correctly deduced that she had lost and Fantasia had won.

Kelly Clarkson is quoted in the June 14, 2004 People magazine as saying she voted for Fantasia: "I just hit redial, redial."

Prior to the results show, the governors of Georgia and North Carolina—the home states of DeGarmo and Barrino respectively—announced a friendly bet between them over which state's resident would prevail, each wagering a VIP NASCAR ticket package and a shipment of his state's signature fruit. The bet participants were Georgia Governor Sonny Perdue, a Republican, and North Carolina Governor Mike Easley, a Democrat.

Elimination chart
Color key:

Controversy
Both Jennifer Hudson and LaToya London, part of final twelve, were eliminated, despite high praises from the judges. After Hudson was eliminated, Elton John, who was a mentor for that season, criticized the vote as 'incredibly racist' in a press conference.

The elimination of both Hudson and London has been pointed out as a classic demonstration of vote-splitting in the American Idol vote, in which the presence of similar choices reduces the votes for each of the similar choices. Hudson, London and Barrino (who would eventually go on to win the competition) were female, African-American, highly praised singers—all appealing to the same demographic bloc of voters. All three of these previously popular singers ended up in the "bottom three" the night Hudson was eliminated—the three having the lowest individual vote counts.

Questions were nevertheless raised about the inadequacy of the phone voting system when it was revealed that the state of Hawaii with a population of just 1.2 million managed to log more calls than every other state apart from New York and California.  Jasmine Trias' and Camile Velasco's fans from Hawaii, which is on its own time zone, enjoyed a far less crowded calling period and were able to get more of their votes through.

Reception

U.S. Nielsen ratings 

Live + same day ratings

This season the show was ranked second overall in total viewer for the 2003–2004 TV seasons, with its Tuesday episodes taking the top spot, averaging 25.73 million viewers, while the Wednesday episodes ranked third with 24.31 million.  It became the top-rated show for the 18-49 demographic for the season, a position it has held for all subsequent years up to and including 2011.

Note 1: The Top 8 shows were shifted to Wednesday and Thursday due to a presidential address on Tuesday.

Live + 7 day (DVR) ratings

Critical response

Awards and nominations

Related programming

Home for the Holidays: Kelly, Ruben, & Fantasia

Home for the Holidays: Kelly, Ruben and Fantasia was aired in November 2004.

American Idol Rewind (season 3)

Re-edited episodes of American Idol third season were shown in syndication as American Idol Rewind.

Music releases
American Idol Season 3: Greatest Soul Classics

Fantasia Barrino
"I Believe" (Single, 2004)
Free Yourself (Album, 2004)
"Truth Is" (Single, 2004)
"Baby Mama" (Single, 2005)
"Free Yourself" (Single, 2005)
"It's All Good" (Single, 2005)
"Ain't Gon' Beg You" (Single, 2005)
Fantasia (Album, 2006)
"Hood Boy" (Single, 2006)
"When I See U" (Single, 2007)
"Only One U" (Single, 2007)
Back to Me (Album, 2010)
"Bittersweet" (Single, 2010)
"I'm Doin' Me" (Single, 2010)
"Collard Greens & Cornbread" (Single, 2011)
"Lose to Win" (Single, 2013)
"Without Me" (Single, 2013)
Side Effects of You (Album, 2013)
"Side Effects of You" (Single, 2013)
The Definition Of... (Album, 2016)
"No Time for It" (Single, 2016)
"Sleeping with the One I Love" (Single, 2016)
"When I Met You" (Single, 2017)
Christmas After Midnight (Album, 2017)
Sketchbook (Album, 2019)
"Enough" (Single, 2019)
 "PTSD" (Single, 2019)

Diana DeGarmo
"Dreams" (Single, 2004)
Blue Skies (Album, 2004)
"Emotional" (Single, 2004)
Unplugged in Nashville (EP, 2009)
"Good Goodbye" (Single, 2012)
Live to Love (EP, 2012)
Gemini (Album, 2019)

Jasmine Trias
"Love Ko 'To" (Single, 2004)
Jasmine Trias (Album, 2005)
"Excuses" (Single, 2005)
"Lose Control" (Single, 2005)
"Sana Lagi" (Single, 2006)
"Kung Paano" (Single, 2006)
"I'd Rather" (Single, 2006)

Latoya London
Love & Life (Album, 2005)
"Appreciate/Every Part of Me/All By Myself" (Single, 2005)

George Huff
My Christmas EP! (EP, 2004)
Miracles (Album, 2005)
George Huff (Album, 2009)

John Stevens
"Come Fly with Me" (Single, 2005)
Red (Album, 2005)
Home For Christmas (Album, 2009)

Jennifer Hudson
"And I Am Telling You I'm Not Going" (Single, 2006)
"Spotlight" (Single, 2008)
Jennifer Hudson (Album, 2008)
"If This Isn't Love" (Single, 2009)
"Giving Myself" (Single, 2009)
I Remember Me (Album, 2011)
"Where You At" (Single, 2011)
"I Remember Me" (Single, 2011)
"No One Gonna Love You" (Single, 2011)
"I Got This" (Single, 2011)
"Think Like a Man" (Single, 2012)
"I Can't Describe (The Way I Feel)" (Single, 2013)
"Walk It Out" (Single, 2014)
JHUD (Album, 2014)
"It's Your World" (Single, 2015)
"Remember Me" (Single, 2017)
"Burden Down" (Single, 2017)
 "I'll Fight" (Single, 2018)

Jon Peter Lewis
"Turn to Grey" (Single, 2004)
"Stories from Hollywood" (Single, 2005)
 "It's Christmas" (Single, 2005)
Stories from Hollywood (Album, 2006)
"If I Go Away" / "Man Like Me" (Single, 2006)
Break the Silence (Album, 2008)
Jon Peter Lewis (EP, 2010)
"Crazylove" (Single, 2010)
Sugar House (Album, 2014)
"Howling at the Moon" (Single, 2014)
Roughcuts (EP, 2015)

Camile Velasco
"Hanging On" (Single, 2005)
"Guava Jelly" (Single, 2008)
"Super Star" (Single, 2010)
"All My Time" (Single, 2013)
Dub Stop (EP, 2014)
"Dub Stop" (Single, 2014)
"You Don't Say" (Single, 2015)
"Mr. Sensi" (Single, 2017)
Tricky One (EP, 2018)
"Can't Get Enough" (Single, 2018)

Leah LaBelle
"Sexify" (Single, 2012)
"What Do We Got To Lose?" (Single, 2012)
"Lolita" (Single, 2013)
Love to the Moon (EP, 2018)

Lisa Leuschner
Sing Me Home (Album, 2004)
Reality (Album, 2007)

Alan Ritchson
This Is Next Time (Album, 2006)
"Mojito" (Single, 2014)

William Hung
Inspiration (Album, 2004)
Hung for the Holidays (EP, 2004)
"We Are the Champions" (Single, 2004)
Miracle: Happy Summer From William Hung (Album, 2005)
"Achy Breaky Heart" (Single, 2005)

Other Contestants
"Love, Lipstick and Poetry" (Kiira Bivens - Single, 2005)
Str8up Band (Dina Lopez's band Str8up - Album, 2005)
"Love, Lana" (Lana Phillips - Single, 2005)
I'll Be Seeing You (John Preator - Album, 2005)
Sun Shiney Day (Lisa Wilson - Single, 2006) 
Just Like Magic (Donnie Williams - Album, 2008)

Concert tour
 American Idols Live! Tour 2004

References

External links
 

American Idol seasons
2004 American television seasons